Benruteleh (also Romanized as Benrūteleh) is a village in Shurab Rural District, Veysian District, Dowreh County, Lorestan Province, Iran. At the 2006 census, its population was 55, in 12 families.

References 

Towns and villages in Dowreh County